The Elk County Courthouse, located at 127 N. Pine in Howard in Elk County, Kansas, was listed on the National Register of Historic Places in 2009.

Architect George E. McDonald designed the brick building with elements of Richardsonian Romanesque and Italian Renaissance Revival style. It was built by Topeka's Morse Contracting in 1907. The brick exterior is yellow/buff in color, with the bottom level finished in rusticated limestone.

McDonald designed three other courthouses listed on the National Register.

References

Government buildings on the National Register of Historic Places in Kansas
Richardsonian Romanesque architecture in Kansas
Renaissance Revival architecture in Kansas
Italian Renaissance Revival architecture
Government buildings completed in 1907
Elk County, Kansas
Courthouses in Kansas